Andy Oakes may refer to:

Andy Oakes (author) (born 1952), English author
Andy Oakes (footballer) (born 1977), English goalkeeper